DAV Public School, Waidhan is a school in Waidhan, Singrauli district, Madhya Pradesh, India. The school was established in 2001 by the D.A.V. College Managing Committee, and opened in 2002. Originally it was situated in a rented building but it has relocated to a campus on a 2.74-acre site. 1300 students are served by 31 teachers along with 8 non-teaching staffs.

References

External links
 

Schools in Singrauli district
Schools affiliated with the Arya Samaj
Singrauli district
High schools and secondary schools in Madhya Pradesh
Educational institutions established in 2001
2001 establishments in Madhya Pradesh